Norm Henderson is an Australian former rugby league footballer who played in the 1960s and 1970s.

Career
Norm Henderson career began at Balmain in 1964. He played four seasons with the Tigers moving to the St. George in 1968, to take over the vacant Hooking position after the retirement of Ian Walsh the previous year. 

Henderson played on at St George for four seasons between 1968 - 1971. He then went on to captain the Cessnock Goannas rugby league club, where he gained legendary status when he captained/coached the club to the Newcastle Premiership in 1972.

Death
Henderson died at Cessnock Hospital on 22 Aug 1975, 3 months after a major brain operation.

Accolades
The Cessnock Goannas named Norm Henderson in their "Team of the Century" in 2011, and the club's 'Player of the Year' award is also named in Norm Henderson's honour.

References

1944 births
1975 deaths
St. George Dragons players
Balmain Tigers players
Australian rugby league players
Country New South Wales rugby league team players
Rugby league hookers
Neurological disease deaths in New South Wales